Sacral veins may refer to:

 Lateral sacral veins
 Median sacral vein